Nottinghamshire County Rowing Association abbreviated NCRA is a rowing club based at the Holme Pierrepont National Watersports Centre in Nottingham.

History
The club was formed in 1981 by a small group of elite rowers from the Trentside clubs in Nottingham UK. Competing in lime green colours, and training on the 2000m rowing course at Holme Pierrepont, NCRA crews enjoyed wins at Henley Royal Regatta and many other elite regattas. At World level, competing as Great Britain, many of the squad's athletes achieved Olympic and World Champion status. Their first international success came in the 1983 World Championships, where an NCRA lightweight coxless four won the silver medal.

In 1989, an eight from NCRA raced Harvard University in the final of the Ladies' Challenge Plate at Henley Royal Regatta. NCRA won the race, but Harvard appealed, and the race was ordered to be rerowed at the end of the day, where NCRA triumphed once more.

After 25 years of national and international success it was disbanded in 2006. In 2017 NCRA was re-formed and crews started training and racing again, based at Holme Pierrepont which resulted in almost immediate national success.

Honours

Recent British champions

Henley Royal Regatta

References

Rowing in England
Rowing associations
Sport in Nottingham
Sports organizations established in 1981
Organizations disestablished in 2006